Veli Pasha (1787–1822) was an Ottoman Albanian governor (pasha) of the Pashalik of Yanina in Epirus, and the second son of Ali Pasha. As an Ottoman commander, he is known for his participation against the Souliotes, the Septinsular Republic, and the Serbian rebels.

History

In 1787 or 1788, following his father's conquest of Ioannina and formation of the Pashalik of Yanina, a 17-year-old Veli was appointed by Ali as ruler of the Sanjak of Trikala with the title Pasha of Trikala. He married Zeivenie, a daughter of Ibrahim Pasha of Berat, in 1798. His second wife was Zybeide H. Vlora, the daughter of Sylejman Pasha. He was a well-educated man and fluent in Albanian, Greek, Turkish and Italian. Between 1807-1812, he ruled the Morea as Pasha.

In 1803, his father sent him with an army to fight the Souliotes. In 1806, following renewed conflict between the Ottomans and Russians, Veli Pasha was sent to attack the Septinsular Republic. Veli Pasha seized Vonitsa, Preveza and Butrint. Ali Pasha married Veli Pasha to his neighbour Ibrahim Pasha's daughter. Veli Pasha was sent to suppress the Serbian rebels in the sanjak of Smederevo (First Serbian Uprising).

By 1804, Veli was the sanjakbey of Delvina and Beylerbey of Rumelia.

By 1807, Veli Pasha had 10,000 soldiers at his disposal. Veli and his brother Muhtar attempted to convince their father to come to terms with the Sublime Porte but to no avail. Nonetheless, Ali Pasha would entrust Preveza to Veli, and Parga to Veli's eldest son Mehmet. In 1812, upon the appearance of Ottoman troops - who had arrived to subdue Ali Pasha - the Muslim population of Preveza threatened to revolt and forced Veli into the citadel. Preveza was blockaded by Turkish and Souliote forces, and the Ottoman government attempted to negotiate his surrender. In order to save his captured son Mehmet (at the pleas of Veli's other son Selim), and in return for an appointment to the Pashalik of St. John of Acre, Veli finally surrendered Preveza and deserted his father's cause.

Legacy
Apart from his appointment as Pasha in multiple regions, Veli Pasha was also known for plundering multiple ancient sites. He plundered the Treasury of Atreus in Mycenae. In April, 1808, he had people dig in Mycenae; he unearthed the Tomb of Clytemnestra among multiple other tombs containing human remains and jewellery, valuable stones and gems. He also unearthed around 25 statues and a marble table. He had them all transported to Tripolitza where he is said to have thrown out the mortal remains and the gems. He sold all other findings to western travellers for 80,000.

References

Sources

19th-century Ottoman military personnel
Ottoman Epirus
People from Epirus (region)
Albanians from the Ottoman Empire
People of the First Serbian Uprising
Ottoman military personnel of the Serbian Revolution
Ali Pasha of Ioannina